Between the Devil & The Deep Blue Sea is the third studio album by Black Stone Cherry. Produced by Howard Benson, it was released on May 27, 2011. The song "Stay" was later covered by Florida Georgia Line, who released it as the fourth single from their debut album Here's to the Good Times.

Track listing

Charts 
The album debuted at No. 29 on the Billboard 200, selling 13,000 copies in its first week.

Personnel 
 Chris Robertson - lead vocals, lead guitar
 Ben Wells - rhythm guitar, backing vocals
 Jon Lawhon - bass guitar, backing vocals
 John Fred Young - drums, backing vocals
 Lzzy Hale - guest vocals

Certifications

References

2011 albums
Black Stone Cherry albums
Roadrunner Records albums
Albums produced by Howard Benson